Kana Tsugihara (つぎはら かな) ( Born August 25, 1984,  in Tokyo, Japan) is a Japanese actress, model and idol who has appeared in various magazines and television shows.

She has body measurements of 87-60-88 cm, and stands 1.58m tall.

Media appearances

Movies
 Second time live (2007, MC Tee) - Kyoko role
 Fight Flight, Vol.3 and The End of the World (2008, cheap production committee Fighting) - Corporate Ling Kisaragi (starring)
 Lived two second time (2008, MC Tee) - Kyoko role
 3 live second time (2008, MC Tee)
 Grudge (2009, T-Joy) - Corporate Mutsumi
 4 The Final live second time (2009, MC Tee) - Kyoko role

Original video
Kitan ghost photography (2006, dot-com Fosaido) - Episode 1, "no pictures of the subject" about Kyoko Higashiyama
Wakaba 
 Cherry Boys School (Years 2009, GP Museum Soft) - Asuka role Yagami (starring)

TV shows
 Girls On Film (MONDO21)
 Bombshell goddess (MONDO21)
 Beauty-H (Tokyo)
 Talk audition gravure (Fuji Television)
 Girl Swimsuit (Tokyo)
 Dream Vision (NTV)
 Kingdom Rank (TBS)
 ☆ Johnny Reviews (NTV)
 Tsu hunt (RajNTV)
 www (TV Yomiuri) - Regular
 Goddess of victory 3rdSTAGE (Chibaterebi) - guest appearance
 Goddotan (August 26, 2009 April 8, 2008 November 12, Tokyo)
 Puromoru (April 2009 - April 2010, E2 promo) - Regular
 SMAP (May 11, 2009, Kansai - Fuji TV) - Special Edition "± 12 the same year"
 Ariken (April 3, 2010, Tokyo)
 London Hearts (April 6, 2010, Asahi) - "SP Magic Mail simultaneous raids spring 2010 hottest entertainers!"
 Ichihachi (May 12, May 5, 2010, MBS)
 Jack 10 (May 19, 2010, NTV)
 Darwin's theory of evolution Beautiful Love (June 10, 2010 - September 30, NTV) Regular
 London Hearts (July 20, 2010, TV Asahi) - "ROUND4 someone want confrontation Body"
 Chestnut Cream & showbiz of saury (Japan) Grand Personal Information (November 5, 2010, Fuji TV)
 Decca Honma!? TV (November 24, 2010, Fuji TV)
 Beach Angels Yoron (March 26, 2011 BS-TBS)
 S dollar box tonight  (October 11, 2011, Tokyo)

TV
Psychic Detective Yakumo to 11 during the opening 10 episodes (2006, Tokyo) - Corporate Miki Sasaki
Supplements I started feeling movement Episode 2 (2006, Fuji Television)
Resident Kira (year 2007,TBS)
Mr. Manna Cafe urban legend of the curse Comics (year 2008, BS-i)
Team Spirit Girls (years 2008, BS-i)

Radio
Tsu mix still Gocha! Yangyang Atsumare ~ ~ (2 May 2009 - 7 August 2010,MBS Radio)
JBRpresents Pureraji (September 2009 - December, FM Inter-Wave, Inc. | InterFM)
Tsu mix Gocha best! (August 2010 - MBS Radio)

Internet
European Poker Tour 2007 (Gya)
Sexy Magazine Yoshiharu Noda # 34 (GyaO)
MIDTOWN TV Tuesday (date of October 1, GyaO 2007 - May 15)
Tea Tsu !(GyaO jockey advertising, November 30, 2007)
24:00 adhesion talent! (GyaO Idol, ShowTime, February 2008)
Teaching a narrow space!(there! Surprised broadcasters, 16 March 2008)
@ Misty (gravure idol, June 26, 2009)

Other products
Ultra-Scale Mini Cushion Cushion
The following Kana Hara (2006, Tri-X)
What next for the original calendar in 2007(2006, Tri-X)
What next for the original 2008 Calendar (2007, Tri-X)
Calendar year 2009 (2008, Tri-X)

References

1984 births
Actresses from Tokyo
Japanese female models
Japanese film actresses
Japanese gravure models
Japanese television actresses
Living people